Al-Huwayz al-Qibla (also known as al-Huwayz or Huweiz) is a village in northern Syria located in the Qalaat al-Madiq Subdistrict of the al-Suqaylabiyah District in Hama Governorate. According to the Syria Central Bureau of Statistics (CBS), al-Huwayz al-Qibla had a population of 2,395 in the 2004 census. Its inhabitants are predominantly Sunni Muslims.

References 

Populated places in al-Suqaylabiyah District
Populated places in al-Ghab Plain